Marco Balzano (born 1978) is an Italian writer. He was born in Milan, where he now works as a teacher of literature in a high school.

Balzano has written several acclaimed novels: 
 Il figlio del figlio, which won the Premio Corrado Alvaro for debut novel
 Pronti a tutte le partenze, winner of the Premio Flaiano
 L'ultimo arrivato, winner of the Premio Campiello

His latest novel Resto qui (I stay here) has garnered widespread critical praise, and was nominated for or won numerous prizes.

Laurels won by Resto qui
 Winner of the Premio letterario Elba
 Winner of the Premio Mario Rigoni Stern
 Winner of the Premio Bagutta 
 Winner of the Premio Asti d'Appello
 Winner of the Prix Mediterranee
 Nominated for the Premio Strega
 Shortlisted for the Prix Femina
 Shortlisted for the Prix du roman FNAC

His work has been translated into German, French, Icelandic and English.

References

Writers from Milan
1978 births
Living people